Teresa, is a Mexican telenovela produced by José Alberto Castro for Televisa. It is a remake of the Mexican telenovela of the same name produced in 1959.

Angelique Boyer, Sebastian Rulli and Aarón Díaz star as the main protagonists, while Cynthia Klitbo and Ana Brenda Contreras star as the co-protagonists. Manuel Landeta, Margarita Magaña and Felicia Mercado played the main antagonists.

Plot 
Teresa Chavez is a beautiful and intelligent young woman, desperately seeking to leave the grinding poverty of the neighborhood where she lives, which causes her to have a miserable and resentful life despite her parents' love and support. After Rosa, her younger sister, dies from a heart disease, Teresa blames not having money for her sister's death. She vows that she will never be penniless again, making plans to escape the life of poverty surrounding her, using her beauty as a way to get out. She is in love with Mariano, a man who lives in the same neighborhood with her and is studying to become a doctor in order to meet Teresa's expectations and fulfill all her dreams, but Teresa is impatient.

While studying at an exclusive school on a scholarship, Teresa meets Paulo, a wealthy and popular young man. Teresa, seeing him as a way to get rich fast, breaks up with Mariano and uses her beauty to charm Paulo. They go out throughout high school, and she tries to convince him to get married, but upon discovering she is poor, he immediately breaks up with her. He offers her to stay with him as his lover, an offer which Teresa rejects. Genoveva, Paulo's mother also disapproves of Paulo ever seeing Teresa again. 
 
Paulo and Aida, Teresa's jealous classmate, who is in love with Paulo, humiliate Teresa in front of their classmates, publicly displaying her poverty and her lies. Teresa swears to never be trampled on again. "Entre ser y no ser, yo soy" ("Between being or not being, I am") becomes one of Teresa's mottos. After her humiliation she swears to bring vengeance on both Aida and Paulo. Teresa then befriends her teacher Arturo de la Barrera, a respected lawyer who offers to pay for her education in law school. Teresa decides to make Arturo fall in love with her. However, seeing that her best friend Aurora is in love with Mariano, she's filled with jealousy and decides to get back together with him. Luisa, Arturo's sister, at first distrusts Teresa, until her "sweetness" convinces her that Teresa is just a humble, but kind girl.
 
While Teresa works for Arturo as an assistant, he unintentionally falls in love with her. Luisa discovers this and convinces Arturo to confess his feelings to her. Teresa fills Arturo with hope while dating Mariano and eventually getting engaged with him. However, she breaks up with Mariano after seeing that he will take a long time to become rich and tells him that she is going to marry Arturo. This destroys Mariano's hope, and he finds solace in Aida's arms after Paulo dies of a drug overdose days before their wedding. At first, Mariano cannot get Teresa out of his head, and he constantly begs her to leave Arturo, but her ambitions keeps her with him. Arturo and Teresa travel to Cancun, and this opens Mariano's eyes, seeing the real Teresa. Teresa marries Arturo. Before this, Teresa met Fernando, Luisa's multimillionaire fiancé and Arturo's best friend. However, their marriage fails because of Arturo's jealousy of Mariano and Teresa's constant thinking of the latter, and Arturo is unfaithful to Teresa with his ex-fiancée Paloma, who discovered Teresa's earlier unfaithfulness with Mariano and dies before she could tell Arturo, Teresa finds out Arturo's secret and almost divorces Arturo. However, Arturo takes her to their belated honeymoon in Europe, and despite her efforts and her constantly thinking of Mariano, Teresa eventually falls in love with Arturo.

Time passes and Arturo finds out that Teresa and Mariano made love the day before Arturo's wedding with Teresa, and that she only married him for his money. Arturo is then thrown into an economic crisis, and doubting the love of Teresa, decides to test her love and takes her to live in the same neighbourhood that she originated from. Tired of the economic crisis, Teresa seeks to improve their status and socio-economic position by seducing Fernando. Mariano finds out and tells Luisa about Teresa's attempt to conquer Fernando's heart, and he openly admits that he's in love with Teresa, breaking off their engagement days before their wedding. Heartbroken, Luisa slowly overcomes her pain and accepts Fernando's decision without any resentment and soon finds that she's pregnant with Fernando's child, through she makes it clear she doesn't want anything with him. Armando, Teresa's father, also finds out about his daughter's actions and, disappointed he dies of a heart attack. At this time, Teresa is now in love with Arturo, but at the same time, she believes that he should recover his status. Lucia, Luisa's real best friend, also likes Arturo, which not only proves Teresa's true love for him, but causes her to be extremely jealous of Lucia.

As the story develops, Teresa successfully seduces Fernando, and convinces him to leave Luisa and to sign over half of his fortune to her. During an interview for their wedding, Teresa turns against her family, stating that she comes from the same socio-economic background as Fernando, and that her parents had died and Juana, her godmother, was merely her nanny. Finally seeing Teresa's true colors, Juana and Refugio, Teresa's mother, are left heartbroken. Later, Teresa tries to justify the rejection saying she felt it was necessary for the interview. All of her friends and family turn against Teresa, criticizing her for preferring money over love. Although Teresa is left alone, she dumps Fernando once she gets his money and attempts to get back Arturo's love for her and forgiveness as she feels that he's her true love. When Arturo is involved in a car accident, Teresa searches for him and he is immediately transported to a nearby hospital. As he slowly recovers, he rejects her for not loving him earlier. Teresa donates all her half of Fernando's money to Paloma's foundation for children after Fernando rejected receiving the stolen fortune. As Teresa tries to correct her mistakes, Refugio denies it as she feels that it's too early to forgive Teresa and can't be sure if her daughter's change is sincere and Juana also refuses to forgive Teresa, leaving her all alone. Back at her house, realizing and accepting that she's been left alone with no loved ones around her, she goes to her room and cries while hugging the teddy bear that Arturo gave her as a gift while stating that she'll start over again. Arturo then appears, and he picks her up from the ground, hugs her and later, they both kiss. She learned what love really is while Arturo forgave her, giving her another chance.

First Alternative Ending:
There was an alternative ending that was broadcast during the popular Mexican show Hoy. This ending had a heartbroken Teresa, finally realizing and accepting that she's all alone now, with none of her loved ones wanting anything to do with her, leaving Arturo's house to begin a new life. Six months later we see her working at a company as an assistant, where she is approached by a man, who we learn is her new boss, asking her to meet him at his office. As she makes her way, Teresa unbuttons her blouse before breaking the fourth wall by smiling seductively to the camera and saying her famous phrase, implying that she's back to her old manipulative ways.

Second Alternative Ending:
In this ending Teresa goes back to her house realizing that no one loves her, and she goes to her room and hugs the bear that Arturo gave her as a gift. Fernando then suddenly appears; he sees Teresa crying. Angry because Teresa ruined his life, he points a gun and shoots. She lies on the ground holding her bear and dies. The scene ends there.

Cast

Main 

Angelique Boyer as Teresa Chávez Aguirre
Cynthia Klitbo as Juana Godoy
Aarón Díaz as Mariano Sánchez Suárez
Sebastián Rulli as Arturo de la Barrera

Also main 

Silvia Mariscal as Refugio Aguirre de Chávez
Manuel Landeta as Rubén Cáceres Muro
Ana Brenda Contreras as Aurora Alcázar
Margarita Magaña as Aída Cáceres Azuela
Fernanda Castillo as Luisa de la Barrera Azuela
Felicia Mercado as Genoveva De Alba Vda. de Castellanos
Juan Carlos Colombo as Armando Chávez
Alejandro Ávila as Cutberto González
Óscar Bonfiglio as Héctor Alcázar
Fabiola Campomanes as Esperanza Medina
Dobrina Cristeva as Mayra Azuela de Cáceres
Toño Mauri as Hernán Ledezma
Luis Fernando Peña as Juan Antonio "Johnny" Gómez Domínguez
Juan Sahagún as Ramón Sánchez
Gloria Aura as Patricia "Paty" Nájera Valverde
Daniel Arenas as Fernando Moreno Guijarro
Guillermo Zarur as Don Porfirio Valverde
Patricio Borghetti as Martín Robles Ayala
Issabella Camil as Paloma Dueñas.
Alejandro Nones as Paulo Castellanos De Alba
Joana Brito as Ignacia "Nachita" de Medina
Willebaldo López as Pedro Medina
Raquel Olmedo as Oriana Guijarro Vda. de Moreno
Eugenia Cauduro as Vanessa Coronel
Mar Contreras as Lucía Álvarez Granados

Recurring 
Hugo Aceves as Rodolfo Méndez "Fito"
Jessica Segura as Rosa "Rosita" Chávez Aguirre
Rodrigo René as Pablo "Pablito" Medina
Monserrat de León as Griselda
Saúl Flores as Saúl
Felipe Nájera as Hugo
Elena Torres as Magda
Eduardo Carvajal as Darío
María Dolores Oliva as Gema
Juan Diego Covarrubias as Julio
Alejandra Adame as Florencia Dueñas y Vélez
María Pía as Ivonne
Roberto Romano as Raúl
Heidi Balvanera as Sasha
Hortensia Gramajo as Reina
Sofía Castro as Sofía
Iván Lomelí as Campesino
Elsa Cárdenas as Director of the Paloma foundation

Guest stars 
Toño Infante as Fausto

Notes

Awards and nominations

Broadcast 
The series originally aired from August 2, 2010 to February 27, 2011 in Mexico on Canal de las Estrellas. The series aired in United States on Univision from March 30, 2011 until October 3, 2011.

Ratings

References

External links

Mexican telenovelas
Televisa telenovelas
2010 telenovelas
2010 Mexican television series debuts
2011 Mexican television series endings
Television series reboots
Spanish-language telenovelas